Leopoldino Fragoso do Nascimento, aka "General Dino", was the Head of the Angolan President's Communication Service under José Eduardo dos Santos' presidency and the Chairman of the Board of Directors of the Cochan Group, one of the top economic groups in Angola.

Mr. Leopoldino Fragoso do Nascimento has been a partner of Trafigura since 2009. Mr. do Nascimento is a founding partner of Unitel Telecom, Kinaxixe Real Estate, Zahara Logistics, Kero Supermarkets and Biocom – Bio Fuels. He has 20 years of experience in which he holds 7 years experience in Puma Energy/Industry. He serves as Director at Puma Energy Holdings Pte Ltd. He is one of Africa’s foremost entrepreneurs. He holds a degree in telecommunication engineering.

U.S. sanctions 
On 9 December 2021, the U.S. Department of the Treasury added do Nascimento and two of his companies - Cochan Holdings and Cochan SA - to its Specially Designated Nationals (SDN) list. Individuals on the list have their assets blocked and U.S. persons are generally prohibited from dealing with them.

External links
List of accusations against General Dino as per Maka Angola portal (portuguese)

References

1963 births
Living people
MPLA politicians
Specially Designated Nationals and Blocked Persons List